Orlando Guerrero Torres is the third and current bishop of the Episcopal Diocese of Venezuela. He was consecrated in 1995, replacing Onell Soto.

External links
Episcopal News Service release

Episcopal bishops of Venezuela
Bishops of the Episcopal Church (United States)
Living people
Year of birth missing (living people)
Place of birth missing (living people)
20th-century Venezuelan people